Reggie Cini (born 22 October 1970 in Malta) was a professional footballer who played for Valletta, Sliema Wanderers and Marsaxlokk during his career, he played as a goalkeeper.

Honours

Valletta
Winner
 1989/90, 1991/92, 1996/97, 1997/98, 1998/99, 2000/01 Maltese Premier League

Winner
 1991, 1995, 1996, 1997, 1999, 2001 Maltese Cup

External links
 

Living people
1970 births
Maltese footballers
Valletta F.C. players
Sliema Wanderers F.C. players
Marsaxlokk F.C. players
Association football goalkeepers
Malta youth international footballers
Malta under-21 international footballers
Malta international footballers